Isamu Kasuya is a Japanese former professional Grand Prix motorcycle road racer. Kasuya began his Grand Prix career in 1963. He had his best season in 1964 when he finished the season in seventh place in the 250cc world championship, and eighth place in the 350cc world championship.

References 

Japanese motorcycle racers
125cc World Championship riders
250cc World Championship riders
350cc World Championship riders
Isle of Man TT riders
Year of birth missing (living people)
Living people
20th-century Japanese people